The sharptooth smooth-hound (Mustelus dorsalis) is a houndshark of the family Triakidae. It is found on the continental shelves of the tropical eastern Pacific from southern Mexico to Peru between latitudes 20°N and 5°S. Its length is up to 64 cm.

The sharptooth smooth-hound dwells on the bottom, feeding on crustaceans, particularly shrimp. Reproduction is viviparous, with four pups per litter, and length at birth about 21 cm.

References
 
 

sharptooth smooth-hound
Western Central American coastal fauna
Fish of Colombia
Fish of Ecuador
sharptooth smooth-hound